One Colombo Night is a 1926 British silent drama film directed by Henry Edwards and starring Godfrey Tearle, Marjorie Hume and Nora Swinburne. The film was based on a story by Austin Phillips.

Premise
After being ruined in business, a man goes to Australia to make his fortune.

Cast
 Godfrey Tearle as Jim Farnell
 Marjorie Hume as Rosemary Thurman
 Nora Swinburne as Jean Caldicott
 James Carew as Richard Baker
 J. Fisher White as Father Anthony
 William Pardue as Pabu
 Julie Suedo as Lalla
 Dawson Millward as Governor
 Annie Esmond as Wife

References

External links

1926 films
Films directed by Henry Edwards
1926 drama films
British drama films
British silent feature films
Films based on British novels
Films set in Sri Lanka
Stoll Pictures films
British black-and-white films
1920s English-language films
1920s British films
Silent drama films